Takii (written: 滝井) is a Japanese surname. Notable people with the surname include:

, Japanese poet
, Japanese judge

See also
Takii Station, a railway station in Moriguchi, Osaka Prefecture, Japan

Japanese-language surnames